Malcolm Dacey (born 12 July 1960 in Swansea) is a former Wales international rugby union player who attained 15 international caps. An outside-half, he played club rugby for Swansea RFC.

Dacey made an appearance for the British & Irish Lions, coming on as a replacement against a Rest of the World XV in 1986. Dacey also played for the Five Nations XV versus the Overseas Unions in 1986. He also represented the Wales B team and the Barbarians.

References

Rugby union players from Swansea
Welsh rugby union players
Wales international rugby union players
British & Irish Lions rugby union players from Wales
Swansea RFC players
Cardiff RFC players
Barbarian F.C. players
1960 births
Living people
Rugby union fly-halves